Bill Winters (born William Randolph Kahl-Winter on July 22, 1954) is an American former professional football offensive lineman who played in the National Football League (NFL), Canadian Football League (CFL), American Football Association (AFA), and United States Football League (USFL) for eight seasons during the 1970s and 1980s. He played college football for Princeton University, and thereafter he played professionally for the Washington Redskins and New York Giants of the NFL, the Montreal Alouettes and BC Lions of the CFL, the Orlando Americans and Carolina Storm of the AFA, and the Tampa Bay Bandits, San Antonio Gunslingers, and Portland Breakers of the USFL.

Early life 
Winters was born in Asbury Park in the Wanamassa section of Ocean Township, Monmouth County, New Jersey. He grew up in nearby Tinton Falls and played high school football, basketball, and baseball for the Monmouth Regional High School Golden Falcons. He was an All-Shore and All-County selection as a three-year quarterback for the team and won the prestigious Thom McAn Scholar Athlete Award for Monmouth County his senior year. He also played catcher on the baseball team and forward on the basketball team.

College career 
Winters received a full academic scholarship to Princeton University, where he graduated with a A.B. in History and a teaching certification in Social Studies. He lettered for the Princeton Tigers, starting out as a quarterback and then moving to tight end where he played his freshman, sophomore, and junior years. His senior year, he played tight end and offensive tackle.

Professional career 
Upon graduation, Winters attended a free agent tryout camp, and earned a contract as an offensive lineman with George Allen's Washington Redskins in 1976, but was released in training camp. In 1977, he signed with new head coach John McVay and the New York Giants, receiving a $5,000 bonus. He suffered a ruptured appendix on July 26 due to dehydration after playing more than sixty five plays in 95 degree heat during a controlled offensive scrimmage against the New York Jets. Winters was expected to make the final roster, with McVay stating on August 9 that "We're going to keep a spot open on our final roster for him," and "That's how much we think of him." On August 17, Winters was placed on the non-football related injury list by the Giants in the hopes of being activated onto the roster once healthy, but developed an infection (peritonitis) keeping him out for the remainder of the season.
Winters was released the following year in training camp on August 15, and picked up on a five-day trial by the Montreal Alouettes of the CFL. He went on to start for head coach Joe Scannella at right tackle for the remainder of the season, which included six of the next eight regular season games, two playoff games, and the 66th Grey Cup. The following year, he was traded to the BC Lions during training camp and played in one preseason game for head coach Vic Rapp but suffered a knee injury during it. The injury required surgery and resulted in him being placed on injured reserve for the season. He spent the 1980 season rehabilitating his knee and started a career as a financial consultant, and legally shortened his name to Bill Winters. He went on to play two full seasons in the AFA, starting twelve games at center for the Orlando Americans in 1981, and thirteen games at right guard and right tackle for the Carolina Storm in 1982. The Storm went undefeated at 13–0 and won the American Bowl league championship that year.

In 1983, Winters signed on with John F. Bassett's Tampa Bay Bandits in the newly emerging USFL, where he started eleven of the team's first twelve games at left guard for head coach Steve Spurrier before sustaining a stress fracture of his right leg, ending his season. He was waived in training camp the following year in 1984, but recalled by the Bandits off waivers after the first regular season game. He was then waived again three games into the regular season, but was claimed by the San Antonio Gunslingers of the USFL, where he started thirteen of the last fourteen games at center for head coach Gil Steinke in their inaugural season. He also did the snapping for field goals and extra points. In 1985, he was traded in the off-season to the Portland Breakers where he rejoined his former line coach from San Antonio Mike Barry. He went on to play eighteen games for the Breakers, starting one game at right guard for head coach Dick Coury. The following year Winters was to sign and play for the Orlando Renegades of the USFL and head coach Lee Corso but the USFL  ceased operations and Winters retired from professional football.

Life after football 
Winters has worked as a financial consultant and insurance agent through the years, and continues to do it part-time. In addition, he has done some acting and voice over work, writing and some coaching. He authored a book called From the Outhouse to the Penthouse and Somewhere in Between: The Story of One Free Agent's Trip Through the Ranks of Pro Football. He is a lifetime member of the National Football League Players Association and a member of the Screen Actors Guild. After serving as a teacher for 9 years and a coach for 4 years in the Spring Independent School District in Houston, Texas, where he helped coach the Spring Dekaney High School Wildcats to the 2011 5A Division II State Football Championship, he resigned his position to pursue new opportunities.

Acting appearances

Television
Fortune Hunter (1994) Guest star as Dawson the star QB
Pointman (1994) Guest star as Donegan the prison guard

Commercials
Nolan Ryan National for Advil (1994) - Featured -Baseball Player at bat

Coaching experience
University of Florida (1988) Graduate assistant, offensive line coach - training camp
Montreal Machine (1991) Volunteer coach - training camp
University of Central Florida (1992) Assistant offensive line coach / special teams
Rhein Fire (2001) Assistant offensive line coach - training camp
Tampa Bay Tech H.S. (2005) Offensive line coach
Princeton University (2006) Sprint football offensive line coach
Tarpon Springs H.S. (2007) Offensive line coach
Team Florida  All American Football League (2008-2009) Assistant offensive line coach
Spring Dekaney H.S. (2009-2014) Assistant offensive line coach / track coach

References

External links

1954 births
Living people
American football offensive linemen
American football tight ends
Canadian football offensive linemen
American players of Canadian football
BC Lions players
Boston/New Orleans/Portland Breakers players
Monmouth Regional High School alumni
Montreal Alouettes players
New York Giants players
Princeton Tigers football players
San Antonio Gunslingers players
Tampa Bay Bandits players
Washington Redskins players
High school football coaches in Florida
High school football coaches in Texas
People from Ocean Township, Monmouth County, New Jersey
People from Tinton Falls, New Jersey
Sportspeople from Monmouth County, New Jersey
Players of American football from New Jersey
Players of Canadian football from New Jersey